Bronze Age Pervert, also known as BAP, is a pseudonymous, far-right Internet personality. He is known for being active on Twitter since 2013, writing the book Bronze Age Mindset (2018), and having hosted a podcast called Caribbean Rhythms since 2019.

Twitter

BAP is an active user of Twitter and has posted under multiple handles due to having his account suspended. Originally BAP joined Twitter in November 2013 under the twitter handle @bronzeageperv until Twitter banned him on February 27, 2017. BAP joined Twitter again in March 2017 under the handle @bronzeagemantis. 
On August 4, 2021, Twitter suspended BAP again. As a result, BAP switched to using Telegram until he was reinstated on Twitter on December 6, 2022. His old account was also unbanned.

BAP's original Twitter biography stated: "Steppe barbarian. Nationalist, Fascist, Nudist Bodybuilder! Purification of world. Revolt of the damned. Destruction of the cities!"

On Twitter, BAP used a multi-layered style, including post-ironic far-right memes alongside inspirational images of bodybuilders. The banner above the  BAP''s Twitter profile was a close up photo of Cellini's Perseus with the Head of Medusa and his Twitter bio was "Aspiring Nudist Bodybuilder. Free speech and anti-xenoestrogen activist." Bronze Age Pervert is very concerned with the aesthetics of the conventionally attractive, classical male physique, and elaborates in Bronze Age Mindset that "the universal body, the correct type discovered by ancient Greek science and art" is "not something you will develop by nurturing your own 'individual' quirks, doxies, and faggotries". It seems BAP considers Greek thought as the kind of "science" that "can uncover for us ... the true hierarchy of biological types". He expresses admiration for Hippocleides for the latter's "display and use [of] his powers and excellences and biological superiority." According to BAP the "Bronze Age Mindset" he advocates and "biological superiority" are inseparable and "the same!". For these reasons Bronze Age Pervert encourages his readers to engage in active cultivation of the body via sports, bodybuilding, martial arts – preferably in the nude like the old Greeks and the early 20th century German Wandervogel and Freikörperkultur movements – as well as nude sunbathing. Something BAP refers to as a life of "sun and steel" in reference to the Japanese author Yukio Mishima's Sun and Steel. 

The account is part of Frogtwitter, a group of pseudonymous online writers with a highly negative view of contemporary American society. This group mythologizes an aristocratic past while engaging in racism and anti-semitism, often through memes laden with heavy irony. Due to their heretical views the presence of Bronze Age Pervert and other members of Frogtwitter on Twitter is precarious. BAP frequently condemns alt-right leadership figures, such as Richard Spencer.

A number of right of center politicians have been criticized for following or interacting with BAP on Twitter, including former White House speechwriter Darren Beattie, Minnesota State Senator Roger Chamberlain, and US Senate candidate Lauren Witzke. In February 2017, Curtis Yarvin sarcastically claimed to The Atlantic that Bronze Age Pervert was his White House "cutout / cell leader". In 2021 El País criticized Spanish politician Manuel Mariscal of the right wing populist Vox party for being seen with a mobile phone case donning an image of the Pepe meme and the fact that BAP, among others, endorsed this signal and encouraged other right wing populists to show their support for "Frogtwitter". In addition to right wing politicians, the broad group of political influencers, bloggers, and podcasters known as 'anti-woke leftists' or 'dirtbag leftists' have received criticism in the liberal press for discussing and engaging with BAP and the broader far right on Twitter, most notably Anna Khachiyan of the Red Scare podcast, who called Bronze Age Pervert "the great genius writer/artist of our age" and said that "all of the good fiction writing now is self-published essentially and coming from the so-called 'alt-right,' and my haters can quote me on that."

Michael Anton described the size of BAP's Twitter presence as 'largish' (>70K followers as of June 2021) and made note of the viral success of the grass roots Twitter book promotion campaign for Bronze Age Mindset as "[l]egions of eager fans quote the book and/or post pictures of its cover in exotic locations and/or lying atop military uniforms, presumably their own". Josh Vandiver of Ball State University observed that Bronze Age Pervert's "cult" following seems to be global in nature with images appearing on social media of "readers holding the book aloft before beaches and mountains across the world". Bronze Age Pervert's followers tend to imitate (aesthetic elements) of his Twitter account, ape the writing style, amplify his ideas and repeat his catchphrases such as "SUBMIT!", "wat means?", and "ghey". Vandiver uses the example of the last term to explain "[w]hen accused of being 'ghey,' [BAP's] preferred spelling of 'gay' – one of many insider code words, partly necessitated by social media censors – BAP accuses his accusers of being themselves hopelessly effete, often by way of comparison to imagined forefathers from a more virile, 'bronze' age". Additionally, Bronze Age Pervert's Twitter followers will "post images of their own physiques, sometimes under the hashtag '#frogtwitter,' seeking BAP's approval and coveted retweet" as well as self-publish their own 'BAPish' books, memes and writings that BAP will generously crosspromote via retweets.

Bronze Age Mindset

Bronze Age Pervert self-published the book Bronze Age Mindset via Amazon Publishing in June 2018. The 77-chapter "exhortation" is written with intentionally poor grammar, mixing Nietzschean philosophy with criticisms of modern society. Bronze Age Pervert explicitly stated that Bronze Age Mindset is not intended as a political manifesto and that it was written in a "mood of revelry and laughter." The mainstream media, Bronze Age Pervert claims, deliberately use "humorlessness as a strategy and pretend to see policy proposals when we engage in fun and trolling."

Book summary 

The book centers on BAP's ideal vision, the eponymous "Bronze Age Mindset", which he defines as "the secret desire…to be worshiped as a god!" and which he calls a state "of complete power and freedom". Its main theme is arguing against the concept of human equality. It discusses classical figures, including Alcibiades, Periander of Corinth, and the heroes of the Homeric epics. In particular BAP elevates and celebrates the pirate and the soldier of fortune as heroic ideals worthy of emulation and asserts that classical education is wasted on both (social) liberals and conventional conservatives. Although BAP does not provide sources, notes or formal references in the book, he mentions Nietzsche, Schopenhauer and pre-Socratic thinkers like Heracleitus very frequently. 

According to Anton, as well as Aaron Renn, the key philosophical concept BAP develops in the book is that of 'owned space'. Anton paraphrases BAP's view of 'space' as being 'owned when it is mastered or controlled. This can either be accomplished by you—or your herd or pride or clan or tribe or nation—or by others." Renn clarifies further that "if you don't have owned space, if you live or build on space owned by others, then you are putting yourself in a highly disadvantageous and vulnerable position, subject to cultural eviction and spiritual homelessness." 

The book is divided into a prologue and four parts: The Flame of Life; Parable of Iron Prison; Men of Power, and the Ascent of Youth; and A Few Arrows. In the introduction BAP informs his readers that “you don’t see yourself as you really are” because “spiritually your insides are all wet, and there’s a huge hole through where monstrous powers are [fucking] your brain, letting loose all your life powers of focus”, the book is his attempt to begin to correct this state of affairs.

In the first part, The Flame of Life, BAP discusses the nature of life itself. Dismissing both teleological and materialistic views of life, he instead argues that life is a struggle for "space", particularly "owned space" (space that is mastered or controlled). BAP condemns Darwinism as ‘bug-­thought’, and instead invokes the Ancient Greek idea of Nemesis: "In nature there is irrepressible f­orce . . . Its destruction of the feeble designs of reason, the pointless words of man – this is beautiful."

In the second part, Parable of Iron Prison, BAP argues that a degraded elite owns all of space in modern times, reducing the rest of humanity to "bugmen". He classifies humanity into three categories: superior people who "desire one thing above all, ever-flowing eternal fame among mortals"; natural bugmen, who make up the majority; and an intermediate class who alternate between serving the natural aristocracy and becoming enforces of the Hobbesian "Leviathan". 

In the third and fourth parts, BAP carries out his exhortation. He alludes to a variety of historical and modern figures, such as Clearchus (as a m[a]n who really didn’t have any hangups, who wasn’t repressed at all” and who was “possessed by the passion for war and adventure"), Agathocles (for inviting and killing the senate and notables of Syracuse to ensure his rule), and Alcibiades (who BAP reimagines Mitt Romney as). He also praises youth and vitality, and he condemns female liberation for supposedly turning democracy into a nation- and civilization ending "terminal disease". BAP highlights mercenaries Robert Denard, who according to BAP was "defending whatever residues of civilization remained in Africa after decolonization", and Mad Mike Hoare and praises the latter for understanding "communism for what it was: the infestation of vermin he was tasked to exterminate, a biological event, not an ideological, political, or historical one." Both Denard and Hoare are celebrated by BAP as latter-day incarnations of the spirit of the Spartan general Brasidas. Additionally BAP explains that “the equivalent of the ‘meme’ in political action is the prank. You really can’t underestimate the power of a good prank.…" the goals of which supposedly is to “make the enemy look ridiculous. You must show them for what they are, which is dour, old, sclerotic, ugly, pedantic; it’s good if you show yourself in the opposite light, although not necessary.”

Towards the end of the book, BAP tells his readers to join the military or intelligence services, learn vital skills, and make enduring friendships in anticipation of potential future military rule of the USA.

Reception 
The New Republic describes the book as "rambling", "dizzying", displaying "prose ... artfully penned" but "arguments ... fractured and incoherent". The Economist echoes the "rambling" classifier. Elisabeth Zerofsky in the New York Times calls the book "a pseudo Nietzschean critique of modernity" written "in a style that mixe[s] a kind of faux-caveman brutishness and message-board pidgin with classical references". Book reviewer Inga-Lina Lindqvist of Swedish Aftonbladet cautions readers that despite the often impenetrable fever-dream style, "to simply dismiss BAP as yet another internet maniac who read Nietzsche and misunderstood Homer's humanistic intentions does not fly. He's too educated, too funny and too influential for that." BAP's thinking is marked by deep anti-egalitarianism and Jesse Russell, writing for paleoconservative Chronicles Magazine, praises "self-styled online intellectual pirate" BAP for realizing that we are currently living in 'Nietzsche's nightmare' of boundless egalitarism; he perceives more acutely than his more libertarian right-wing critics like C. Bradley Thompson of Clemson University's Institute for the Study of Capitalism and "his Straussian friends". Andrew Marzoni in Aeon Magazine is less impressed and calls the book "Nietzschean pastiche", "a tedious commentary on classical philosophy", an unoriginal, basic paleoconservative call to action after "100 pages of manipulating Empedocles and Heraclitus into refutations of evolutionary biology, civilizational progress, the liberation of women and LGBTQ groups, and the contemporary effeminisation of men (much of which omits definite articles in mock imitation of a caveman)".

In 2019, conservative intellectual Michael Anton reviewed Bronze Age Mindset for the Claremont Review of Books in a friendly yet critical manner, thus exposing a more mainstream right wing audience to the thought of BAP. Anton claims that the book's provocativeness makes it successful and popular among right wing youths: "it appeals to the young; it appeals to the young in part because it's outrageous ... [I]t opens not just the author but his readers to 'attaq'." Bronze Age Mindset was first given to Anton by Curtis Yarvin, a major figure in the neoreactionary movement, and political philosopher Darren Beattie encouraged Anton to read it. The Straussian Claremont Institute subsequently published a symposium on the review in their online publication The American Mind, including a response essay from BAP in which he compared "the anti-male and anti-white rhetoric of the new left" to anti-Tutsi propaganda before the Rwandan genocide. In the same symposium, Anton responded to BAP's response by reiterating his concern about the 'BAPist' wholesale rejection of the equality principle of the American Founding and the philosophical and practical consequences of said rejection.

Tara Isabella Burton in her discussion of Bronze Age Mindset in her own book Strange Rites highlights BAP's tirades against the 'bugman', a concept of a human that is analogous to Nietzsche's and Kojève's idea of the wretched 'last man'. According to Burton, BAP spends most of Bronze Age Mindset deriding the progressive, sensitive bugmen of the twenty-first century, whom she describes as beta males denuded of their strength by the feminizing corruption of politically correct modernity. The bugman, according to BAP, "pretends to be motivated by compassion, but is instead motivated by a titanic hatred of the well-turned-out and beautiful." Supposedly, the bugman is animated by pure ressentiment, and longs to tear down all that is stronger, more beautiful and more powerful than he is. In BAP's own words: "The bugman seeks to bury beauty under a morass of ubiquitous ugliness and garbage, ... thus his garbage is flowing out of cities built on piles of unimaginable filth. The waters are polluted with birth control pills and mind-bending drugs emitted by obese high-fructose corn syrup-guzzling beasts."

Bronze Age Mindset gained a cult following in right-wing circles, including staffers of the Trump White House and on Capitol Hill, according to anonymous sources described by Politico and Huffington Post. 24 year old National Review writer Nate Hochman claims that many of his peers who read BAM and Anton's review ended up interning at Claremont Institute and that while they supposedly didn't took Bronze Age Pervert’s philosophy completely seriously, Hochman asks "why did every junior staffer in the Trump administration read ‘Bronze Age Mindset?’ There was something there that was clearly attractive to young conservative elites.” In the summer of 2018 it was among the top 150 books sold on Amazon sitewide, which is notable according to Anton and Dan DeCarlo since it was achieved without the aid of a publicist or book deal. In October 2019, it was still ranked third in Ancient Greek History and #174 in Humour on the Amazon best-seller list.

Caribbean Rhythms

In August 2019, BAP began a podcast called Caribbean Rhythms with Bronze Age Pervert, hosted on Gumroad. The show consists of topics ranging from rants on contemporary geopolitics to opposition to journalism and institutions to introductions to classical political theory, punctuated by samples of classical music. The Spectator highlights the highly ironic nature of the podcast: "Listening to an episode of Caribbean Rhythms is a lot like being trapped in a radio version of The Manchurian Candidate: no one is who they seem."

The podcast has covered topics such as Charles of Anjou and the Sicilian Vespers, ancient patterns of migration, and Alexander the Great's colonies in Bactria. According to the conservative National Review, the podcast uses a narrative style of history that highlights the historical drama of great men.

Criticism
Political science professor C. Bradley Thompson objects to BAP's illiberal, anti-equality, anti-American, anti-rationalist stances and considers Bronze Age Pervert and his writings to be more or less fascist in nature. Other (Christian) right-wing critiques, like those of Dan DeCarlo, tend to focus on the "empty aesthetics" of the youthful "BAPist" movement and it being "a deeper recrudescence of paganism." Jesse Russell notes that fundamentally, the right wing critique of "BAPism" differs little from the critique by the conventional right of the alt-right movement during Donald Trump's unlikely 2016 presidential campaign.

Left-wing and liberal critics of BAP have identified him as part of the manosphere as an (ultra)masculinist and as part of a wider atavistic trend on the post-liberal populist right wing. Additionally, liberal classics scholars and commentators accuse BAP (and others like him) of misusing, misinterpreting and misappropriating the Classics for their political agendas.

Vassar College's Pharos project, whose mission is "to document appropriations of Greco-Roman culture by hate groups online", accuses BAP of providing the "traditionalist right wing" with a tailormade "mythic" narrative that depends "on a toxic blend of misogyny and white supremacy, with the ancient world as its archetype and source of prestige." Pharos is aligned with Donna Zuckerberg's Eidolon project, Zuckerberg dedicated her book Not All Dead White Men to documenting how (alt-right) men's groups are supposedly using ancient sources to give their antifeminism, toxic masculinity and patriarchal white supremacy a "veneer of intellectual authority and ancient wisdom". Michael Anton in turn describes aforementioned movement led by Zuckerberg as "calls... to police how the [classical] canon is taught... [and] to attack and even censor its "misuse" by "bad actors" who use it to challenge the [liberal] Narrative" in his book The Stakes.

Academic Josh Vandiver writes that the broader alt-right and the manosphere, both of which he considers BAP to be a prominent member, "is unique, and a product of its time, in making masculinity an overt discursive subject and a core (if contested) concept in its ideology, a type of masculinism" which should be understood as "reactions to the perceived triumph of feminist and LGBTQ politics", and thus were critical to the creation of the alt-right. Within that so-called manosphere, masculinity in its various forms is explicitly named and its relation to politics, culture, society, sex, and sexuality is vigorously debated. He also notes that BAP, as well as other alt-right platforms, have revived the idea of the Männerbund, which Vandiver describes as "the intensive grouping of male warriors and initiates understood to have dominated pre-Christian Indo-European societies, especially Germanic ones." Vandiver concludes by cautioning that BAP and the rest of the manosphere "will continue to take the [far right] movement into unusual and uncharted territory".

Tara Isabella Burton categorizes the "BAPist" phenomenon as fundamentally an atavist, backward-looking one. According to Burton, "at once a conscious rejection of intuitionalist values and, in many ways, their natural heir, modern atavism promotes a nostalgic, masculinist vision of animal humanity." It is the nostalgic focus on an idealized notion of the past because "once upon a time, this narrative goes, in a vanished age of gods and heroes, men were men and women were women. Human beings acted in accordance with their biological destiny. Men fought wars. Women had babies." However, in each case, humanity has supposedly fallen away from its inherent nature and intended purpose. Burton argues further that atavism is not a new phenomenon at all: "from Friedrich Nietzsche onward, modern reactionary culture has fetishized the imagined past and condemned (...) 'sclerotic' (to use BAP's word) civilizations of the present." In her book Strange Rites, Burton explains that according to atavists, "real freedom" lies in submission to (biological) hierarchies, nature, strongmen and Nietzschean supermen worth submitting to. Burton adds: "as Bronze Age Pervert is fond of saying: 'SUBMIT!.

The conclusion of Burton's discussion of the "BAPist" phenomenon, among various other novel right- and left-wing, new age, pagan witchcraft, wellness, techno-utopian and transhumanist ideological communities, is more akin to a religious cult than a traditional political community as observed in the 20th century. Vandiver concurs with this sentiment and posits that "if a religion emerges from the Alt-Right, BAP may prove, in retrospect, to have been one of its founders." Thompson is also keen to point out that "BAP devotees treat him as prophet just as the natives first treated Kurtz in The Heart of Darkness" and that his following includes "the most unlikely of groups, namely, graduate students and junior faculty trained in political philosophy, particularly those from the so-called Straussian school of thought."

See also
 Might Is Right
 Lebensphilosophie
 Nouvelle Droite
 Aristocratic radicalism
 Philosophy of Friedrich Nietzsche

Notes

References

Bibliography

Further reading

External links 

 Twitter account
 Caribbean Rhythms
 YouTube channel

21st-century pseudonymous writers
Alt-right writers
Living people
Date of birth missing (living people)
Year of birth missing (living people)
American modern pagans
Modern pagan writers